América des Cayes is a professional football club based in Les Cayes, Haiti. They were promoted to the Ligue Haïtienne in 2009.

Honours
Ligue Haïtienne: 1
2014

Current players

References

Football clubs in Haiti
1973 establishments in Haiti
Association football clubs established in 1973
Les Cayes